Kendriya Vidyalaya, Dewas  (KV Dewas) is a school that is part of Kendriya Vidyalaya Sangathan. It was established in 1981 and administered through KVS Bhopal region which works under the direct guidance of Ministry of Human Resource and Development. It has been affiliated with CBSE and school is situated in the Bank Note Press (BNP) area, Dewas.
The school building includes classrooms for classes 1 to 12 and other administrative offices.

References

Kendriya Vidyalayas
Schools in Madhya Pradesh